Fukche Advanced Landing Ground  is an airfield in the Demchok sector of the union territory of Ladakh, India. It was built shortly before the 1962 Sino-Indian War and was revived in 2008. It is located adjacent to Koyul, 34 km northwest of Demchok.

Location

The Fukche Landing Ground is in the Koyul Lungpa river valley, close to the confluence of the river with the Indus River (called "Sengge Zangbo" locally). The Line of Actual Control (LAC) with China, which runs along the Indus River, is only  2.5 kilometres away. Beyond the LAC is Chinese-controlled Demchok sector up to the Chang La pass (also called Xingong La).

There is a regular highway from Fukche to Dungti and beyond (leading to Leh and Chushul), and an unmetalled road to Demchok, 34 km southeast at the southern tip of the Indian-controlled Demchok sector.

China runs a "Sengge Zangbo highway" adjacent to the LAC and a "Kigunaru highway" going to Chang La and beyond.

History
The landing ground was first prepared in 1961 in advance of the 1962 Sino-Indian war. It was the sixth such landing ground to be prepared in Ladakh, starting with Leh in 1948 (which was in the midst of the First Kashmir War). According to a retired Army officer, "The Landing Grounds were built on grounds that were hard, barren and sandwiched between almost a range of parallel running mountains. At most places it was a question of removing boulders, filling potholes and generally leveling the ground. The good old infantry equipment of a pick axe, shovel and crow bar came in very handy."

After the 1962 Sino-Indian war, the airstrip fell out of use. It was reopened on 4 November 2008 by the Indian Air Force, when an AN-32 transport aircraft was successfully landed there.
The reactivation of the landing ground, along with another reactivation of the Daulat Beg Oldi airstrip earlier in May of the same year, allows Indian forces to deploy faster and in greater numbers, which China is believed to have taken as a threat. During the 2013 Depsang standoff, China demanded the bunkers being constructed at Fukche be stopped. But the Indians pointed out the constant upgrading of the Chinese infrastructure on their side of the LAC. In the end, the Chinese disengaged at Despang without insisting on concessions regarding Fukche.

Facilities
The airfield has an unpaved gravelly runway of 2 miles length. It accommodates small transport aircraft, meant for inducting or recycling troops at the border.

Road connectivity

Chushul-Dungti-Fukche-Demchok highway (CDFD road), along the southern bank of Indus river which marks the LAC, will be converted to a single-lane 7.45 m wide 135 km long national highway with paved shoulder by 31 March 2025. Chushul and Fukche Airstrips lie along this highway. It will also provide faster access to the Nyoma airbase.

See also
 List of Indian ALGs
 India-China military deployment on LAC
 India-China Border Roads

References

Bibliography

Further reading
 Air Marshal K. K. Nohwar, Pace of Infrastructure Development in Border Areas: Adequate?, Centre for Air Power Studies, 13 March 2018

External links
 IAF's ALG

Indian Air Force bases
Buildings and structures in Ladakh
Transport in Leh